The Drosos Foundation is a non-profit, charitable organization based in Zurich, Switzerland. Established in late 2003 with capital from a private endowment, the foundation was fully active by early 2005. The foundation is involved with more than 100 projects as of 2015, which work to fight poverty, promote health, increase access to education and creative activities for youth, and protect the environment. The foundation also has offices in Cairo, and Casablanca.

See also 
 Amal Women's Training Center and Moroccan Restaurant
 Switzerland portal

References

External links 
 

Organizations established in 2003
Charities based in Switzerland
Organisations based in Zürich
Poverty-related organizations
International educational organizations
International environmental organizations